Monomorium inquilinum is a species of ant in the genus Monomorium. It is native to Mexico.

References

Insects of Mexico
inquilinum
Hymenoptera of North America
Insects described in 1981
Taxonomy articles created by Polbot